Thomas Daniel Wagstaffe was an English professional footballer who played as an inside forward for Sunderland.

References

People from Patna district
English footballers
Association football inside forwards
Fleetwood Town F.C. players
Sunderland A.F.C. players
Morecambe F.C. players
Crewe Alexandra F.C. players
Mossley A.F.C. players
English Football League players